Else Margrethe Ahlmann-Ohlsen (5 November 1907 – 26 February 1994) was a Danish fencer. She competed in the women's individual foil at the 1928 Summer Olympics.

References

External links
 

1907 births
1994 deaths
Danish female foil fencers
Olympic fencers of Denmark
Fencers at the 1928 Summer Olympics
Sportspeople from Copenhagen